Twin Harbors State Park is a public recreation area covering  on the Pacific Ocean two miles south of the town of Westport in Grays Harbor County, Washington. The site was once a U.S. Army training ground, which the state began acquiring for park use in 1937. The state park offers camping, fishing, clamming, beachcombing, and a half-mile interpretive trail in a shoreline pine forest.

References

External links
Twin Harbors State Park Washington State Parks and Recreation Commission 
Twin Harbors State Parks Map Washington State Parks and Recreation Commission

Parks in Grays Harbor County, Washington
State parks of Washington (state)
Protected areas established in 1937